Coleophora pseudolinosyris is a moth of the family Coleophoridae. It is found in Italy, Slovenia, Austria, Croatia, Slovakia, Hungary, the Czech Republic, Romania and southern Russia.

The larvae feed on the flowers of Galatella sedifolia cana, Galatella punctata and Tripolium pannonicum.

References

pseudolinosyris
Moths of Europe
Moths described in 1979